The Imamzadeh Seyed Mohammad is an Imamzadeh related to the Ilkhanate and is located in Khomeyni Shahr County. It contains the tomb of Imamzadeh Seyed Mohammad, son of Zayd ibn Ali.

Sources 

Mosques in Iran
Religious buildings and structures with domes
National works of Iran
Safavid architecture